Yahyo Nuriddinovich Azimov (born 4 December 1947) is a Tajikistani politician. He was the 6th Prime Minister of Tajikistan between 8 February 1996 and 20 December 1999. Before this, he was a factory manager in Khujand.

References

1947 births
Living people
Prime Ministers of Tajikistan
People from Khujand

Tajik SCNS chairmen